Cephalopyge trematoides is a pelagic species of nudibranch. A free-swimming marine gastropod in the family Phylliroidae. Cephalopyge trematoides is the only known species in its genus (i.e. the genus is monotypic).

Etymology 
The species epithet trematoides expresses a likeness to flukes.

Description 
C. trematoides grows to 2.5 cm in length. It swims at approximately 12 cm/s, by passing several undulatory waves down its body each second. It is flattened and transparent; its internal organs are visible.

Pelagic nudibranchs 
Of the approximately 3000 species of nudibranch, the vast majority are benthic, only a couple are neustonic, and C. trematoides is very unusual in that it is pelagic. It is estimated to be one of only five planktonic nudibranch species (another epipelagic example is Phylliroe bucephala).

Further information (including photos): 
 Nudibranch Encyclopedia Kousuke Chibi (in Japanese)
 Seaslugs of Hawai'i by Cory Pittman and Pauline Fiene

References

External links 
 film of Cephalopyge swimming

Phylliroidae
Gastropods described in 1905